William Hussey (1523/24 – 22 March 1570) was an English politician.

He was a Member (MP) of the Parliament of England for Scarborough in 1555.

References

1524 births
1570 deaths
English MPs 1555